Deep Duck Trouble Starring Donald Duck, released in Japan as , is a Sega Master System and Game Gear video game originally released in 1993. It is a Disney-licensed game developed by Sega.

Gameplay
This game is a platform game reminiscent of Castle of Illusion Starring Mickey Mouse, as both have similar gameplay elements.

Donald's chief means of attack are kicking blocks (some of which contain diamonds or ice cream cones) and consuming chili peppers, which temporarily enable Donald to plow through all enemies at high speed. The player can choose map locations to begin the game. If a player loses three lives, the game is over.

Plot
Donald Duck is beckoned by his uncle Scrooge McDuck from a curse which has puffed him up into a floating balloon.

Release
In 1999, Majesco re-released this game, under license from Sega, in the United States.

Reception

The game has received "favorable" reviews, according to Sega Magazine. They game the Sega Master System version a 80% while they gave the Sega Game Gear version an 81%.

References

External links

1993 video games
Aspect Co. games
Disney video games
Donald Duck video games
Game Gear games
Sega video games
Master System games
Platform games
Video games scored by Saori Kobayashi
Video games developed in Japan